Raymond Ingersoll (1875–1940) was borough president of Brooklyn from 1934 to 1940, and Brooklyn Parks Commissioner from 1914 to 1917. Ingersoll Hall, one of the first buildings on the Brooklyn College campus, was named for him.

The World War II Liberty Ship  was named in his honor.

References

1875 births
1940 deaths
Brooklyn borough presidents